Henry Joseph Jacobs (21 December 1913 – 15 February 2000) was an Australian rules footballer who played with Fitzroy and Hawthorn in the Victorian Football League (VFL).

Notes

External links 

1913 births
2000 deaths
Australian rules footballers from Victoria (Australia)
Fitzroy Football Club players
Hawthorn Football Club players